Giuseppe Caruso (22 December 1935 – 28 May 2018), best known as Pippo Caruso, was an Italian composer, conductor and music arranger.

Biography 

Born in Belpasso, Catania, Caruso linked his professional success to the television presenter Pippo Baudo, who had been his university fellow and that Caruso regularly flanked as conductor in his TV programs starting from Canzonissima 1973. Caruso composed several successful songs, including Mita Medici's "A ruota libera" and Lorella Cuccarini/Alessandra Martines' "L'amore è", and, starting from sixties, Caruso also signed several film soundtracks, such as Kill Johnny Ringo and Maladolescenza.

References

External links 
 
 Pippo Caruso at Discogs

1935 births
2018 deaths
Italian film score composers
Italian male film score composers
Musicians from the Province of Catania
Italian conductors (music)
Italian male conductors (music)